Quézac is the name of two communes in France:

 Quézac, in the Cantal department
 Quézac, in the Lozère department